Albert Wyatt (23 October 1886 – 1950) was a British long-distance runner. He competed in the men's marathon at the 1908 Summer Olympics.

References

External links
 

1886 births
1950 deaths
Athletes (track and field) at the 1908 Summer Olympics
British male long-distance runners
British male marathon runners
Olympic athletes of Great Britain
Place of birth missing